Three are Three (Spanish: Tres eran tres) is a 1955 Spanish comedy film directed by Eduardo García Maroto. In three separate segments it parodies different film genres.

Awarded in 1954 the Golden Medal of the Cinema Writers Circle to the best screenplay
.

Cast

References

Bibliography 
 Bentley, Bernard. A Companion to Spanish Cinema. Boydell & Brewer 2008.

External links 
 

1955 comedy films
Spanish comedy films
1955 films
1950s Spanish-language films
Films directed by Eduardo García Maroto
Films with screenplays by Antonio de Lara
Films scored by Augusto Algueró
1950s Spanish films